The 1973–74 NCAA Division I men's basketball season began in November 1973, progressed through the regular season and conference tournaments, and concluded with the 1974 NCAA Men's Division I Basketball Tournament Championship Game on March 25, 1974, at the Greensboro Coliseum in Greensboro, North Carolina. The North Carolina State Wolfpack won its first NCAA national championship with a 76–64 victory over the Marquette Warriors.

Rule changes 
Holding or grabbing an opposing player away from the ball became fouls, as did illegal screens.

Season headlines 

 Prior to the beginning of the season, NCAA Division I replaced the NCAA University Division as the subdivision of the NCAA made up of colleges and universities competing at the highest level of college sports. In addition, NCAA Division II and NCAA Division III replaced the NCAA College Division for colleges and universities competing at a lower level, with Division II consisting of schools awarding limited athletic scholarships and Division III consisting of schools offering no athletic scholarships.
 In the Pacific 8 Conference, UCLA won its eighth of what would ultimately be 13 consecutive conference titles.

Season outlook

Pre-season polls 

The top 20 from the AP Poll and UPI Coaches Poll during the pre-season.

Conference membership changes

Regular season

Conference winners and tournaments

Informal championships

Statistical leaders

Post-season tournaments

NCAA tournament

Final Four 

 Third Place – UCLA 78, Kansas 61

National Invitation tournament

Semifinals & finals 

 Third Place – Boston College 87, Jacksonville 77

Awards

Consensus All-American teams

Major player of the year awards 

 Naismith Award: Bill Walton, UCLA
 Helms Player of the Year: David Thompson, NC State
 Associated Press Player of the Year: David Thompson, NC State
 UPI Player of the Year: Bill Walton, UCLA
 Oscar Robertson Trophy (USBWA): Bill Walton, UCLA
 Adolph Rupp Trophy: Bill Walton, UCLA
 Sporting News Player of the Year: Bill Walton, UCLA

Major coach of the year awards 

 Associated Press Coach of the Year: Norm Sloan, NC State
 Henry Iba Award (USBWA): Norm Sloan, NC State
 NABC Coach of the Year: Al McGuire, Marquette
 UPI Coach of the Year: Digger Phelps, Notre Dame
 Sporting News Coach of the Year: Digger Phelps, Notre Dame

Other major awards 

 Frances Pomeroy Naismith Award (Best player under 6'0): Mike Robinson, Michigan State
 Robert V. Geasey Trophy (Top player in Philadelphia Big 5): Ron Haigler, Penn
 NIT/Haggerty Award (Top player in New York City metro area): Bill Campion, Manhattan

Coaching changes 

A number of teams changed coaches during the season and after it ended.

References